Frogrun! (also Frog Run) is a Frogger clone published by Anirog Software for the VIC-20 home computer in 1983. A Commodore 64 version programmed by Jef Gamon was published in 1984 as Frogrun 64. A ZX Spectrum version by S.J. Dann was released with the name Frog Run.

Gameplay
The game follows the structure of Frogger: maneuver across a busy road, then hop on floating objects to reach the frog homes on the other side of a river.

Taken from the games instructions:

10 points for moving frog forward.
200 points for getting a frog home.
A bonus for all the frogs home.
A bonus for jumping on a lady frog.
There is a time limit of 25 seconds to get a frog home.

References

External links

1983 video games
Action video games
Anco Software games
Commodore 64 games
Single-player video games
VIC-20 games
Video game clones
Video games about amphibians
Video games developed in the United Kingdom
ZX Spectrum games